Air Chief Marshal Anil Yashwant Tipnis, PVSM, AVSM, VM, ADC (born 15 September 1940) served as Chief of the Air Staff of the Indian Air Force from 31 December 1998 to 31 December 2001. He commanded the Air Force to distinction during the Kargil War, when the force flew air superiority and close air support at heights of over 18,000 feet

Early life and education
Anil Yashwant Tipnis was born on 15 September 1940. He did his education at Barnes School, Deolali. After his schooling, he joined the National Defence Academy, (NDA) Pune in January 1956.

Career
Tipnis was commissioned as a fighter pilot on 28 May 1960. He spent his initial years as an operational pilot in several front line fighter squadrons.

During the Indo-Pakistani War of 1965, Tipnis served with The First Supersonics, the 28 Squadron.
After the war, Tipnis was deputed to Iraq as a Pilot Attack Instructor (PAI).

Tipnis qualified as a Fighter Combat Leader at the Tactics and Air Combat Development Establishment (TACDE) in 1973.

After attending the Staff College course at the Defence Services Staff College, Wellington, Wing Commander Tipnis took command of 23 Squadron quipped with Mig 21 Bison. After this stint, Tipnis was also short-listed (one among four) for the Interkosmos space program.

As an Air Commodore, Tipnis commanded Air Force Station Gwalior which was equipped with Mirage 2000.

He attended the Defence Studies Course at National Defence College in 1989. On promotion to Two-star rank, AVM Tipnis was appointed Assistant Chief of the Air Staff (Inspection) at Air HQ. He later took over as Air Officer Commanding (AOC) J & K Area.

As an Air Marshal, Tipnis served as Senior Air Staff Officer (SASO) of Eastern Air Command and of Western Air Command. He later served as the Air Officer Commanding-in-Chief of the Western Air Command from Aug 1995 to March 1997.

Tipnis then moved to Air HQ and served as the Vice Chief of the Air Staff before taking over as the 18th Chief of the Air Staff.

Awards and decorations

References

1940 births
Living people
Indian Air Force officers
Chiefs of Air Staff (India)
Vice Chiefs of Air Staff (India)
Recipients of the Param Vishisht Seva Medal
Recipients of the Ati Vishisht Seva Medal
National Defence College, India alumni
Recipients of the Vayu Sena Medal
Defence Services Staff College alumni